Ejiogu is a Nigerian surname. Notable people with the surname include:

 Chijioke Ejiogu (born 1984), Nigerian footballer
 Sir Jude Ejiogu, Nigerian politician

Surnames of Nigerian origin